Sevilleja de la Jara is a municipality located in the province of Toledo, Castile-La Mancha, Spain. According to the 2006 census (INE), the municipality has a population of 907 inhabitants.

Villages
Buenasbodas
Gargantillas (Gargantilla de la Jara)
Minas de Santa Quiteria 
Puerto del Rey (Puerto Rey)

References

External links 
Diputación de Toledo
Web about Sevilleja de la Jara y ACR La Jara

Municipalities in the Province of Toledo